Justice Hammond may refer to:

Edwin Hammond, associate justice of the Supreme Court of Indiana
Hall Hammond, chief judge of the Maryland Court of Appeals
John Hammond (Massachusetts judge), associate justice of the Massachusetts Supreme Judicial Court

See also
Justice Haymond (disambiguation)